Seeds We Sow is the sixth solo album by American musician and Fleetwood Mac vocalist-guitarist Lindsey Buckingham, released on September 6, 2011. It is his first to be self-released.

The album entered the Billboard 200 in the week of September 24, 2011. By reaching number 45, Seeds We Sow ties with 1984's Go Insane as Buckingham's second most successful album after his 1981 debut Law and Order. It also reached number 6 on the Billboard Rock Album Chart and number 5 on the Billboard Independent Albums Chart. The title track was also released as a single but failed to chart.

Track listing
All tracks written by Lindsey Buckingham except where stated.

"Seeds We Sow" – 3:43
"In Our Own Time" – 4:20
"Illumination" – 2:19
"That's the Way That Love Goes" – 3:56
"Stars Are Crazy"  (Lindsey Buckingham, Lisa Dewey) – 4:50
"When She Comes Down"  – 4:48
"Rock Away Blind" – 3:57
"One Take" – 3:28
"Gone Too Far" – 3:24
"End of Time" – 3:57
"She Smiled Sweetly" (Mick Jagger, Keith Richards) – 2:53
"End of Time" (acoustic) – Amazon MP3 download – 4:12
"Seeds We Sow" (electric) – Amazon MP3 download – 3:57
"Sleeping Around the Corner" – iTunes download – 3:33

Single releases
'Seeds We Sow' was offered as a free download ahead of the album release date, 'When She Comes Down' was released in the UK via digital download and 'In Our Own Time' and 'End of Time' were serviced to radio stations as promotional releases.

Format
The album was released physically on CD as an eleven-track album with an additional three tracks available as a digital download. The album was also released as a limited-edition 180-gram red vinyl gatefold 2×LP via Back On Black records.

Personnel

Musicians 
 Lindsey Buckingham – vocals, guitars, bass, keyboards, percussion, drums, programming
 Brett Tuggle – keyboards (4)
 Neale Heywood – bass (4)
 Walfredo Reyes, Jr. – drums (4)
 Kristen Buckingham – sequencing

Production 
 Lindsey Buckingham – producer, recording, mixing
 Stephen Marcussen – mastering at Marcussen Mastering (Hollywood, California)
 Stewart Whitmore – digital editing
 Jeri Heiden – art direction 
 Nick Steinhardt – design
 Jeremy Cowart – photography
 Tom Consolo – management (for Front Line)
 Irving Azoff – management (for Front Line)
 Buckingham Records LLC

Reception

References 

Lindsey Buckingham albums
2011 albums
Albums produced by Lindsey Buckingham